Vuković is a common family name found in Bosnia and Herzegovina, Croatia, Montenegro, and Serbia, of which bearers are either Bosniaks, Croats, Montenegrins or Serbs, as well as medieval families long before idea of national identity ever appeared.

It is the ninth most frequent surname in Croatia.

People
 Aleksandar Vuković (born 1979), Serbian-Polish football manager
 Andrija Vuković (born 1983), Croatian footballer
 Božidar Vuković (1466-1540), Venetian-Serb printer
 Čedo Vuković (born 1920), Montenegrin writer
 Daniel Vukovic (born 1986), Canadian-Swiss ice hockey player
 Danny Vukovic (born 1985), Australian footballer, of Serbian descent
 Dejan Vuković (born 1978), Serbian politician
 Domagoj Vuković (born 1993), Croatian basketball player
 Dragan Vuković (born 1963), Serbian basketball coach
 Drago Vuković (born 1983), Croatian handball player
 Dražen Vuković (born 1981), Croatian footballer
 Gavro Vuković (1852-1928), Montenegrin Serb duke and writer
 Goran Vuković Majmun (1959-1994), Serbian mobster
 Helena Vuković (born 2000), Croatian judoka 
 Hrvoje Vuković (born 1979), Croatian football player
 Ivan Vuković (born 1987), Montenegrin footballer
 Jagoš Vuković (born 1988), Serbian footballer
 Janko Vuković (1871-1918), Croatian sailor in the Austro-Hungarian navy
 Jelena Vuković (born 1975), Croatian paralympic athlete
 Josip Vuković (born 1992), Croatian footballer
 Katarina Vuković, Bosnian noblewoman
 Lazar Vuković (died 1410), Serbian prince
 Maja Vuković, computer scientist
 Marija Vuković (born 1990), Serbian footballer 
 Marija Vuković (born 1992), Montenegrin athlete
 Matija Vuković (1925-1985), Serbian sculptor
 Mark Vukovic (born 1977), American educator
 Mihajlo Vuković (1944-2021), Serbian basketball player and coach
 Milan Vuković (1933-2018), Croatian jurist and judge
 Milan Vuković (born 1988), Serbian footballer
 Milena Vuković (born 1986), Serbian footballer
 Miljan Vuković (born 1990), Serbian rower
 Nemanja Vuković (born 1984), Montenegrin footballer
 Nikola Vuković (born 1996), Serbian footballer
 Predrag Vuković (born 1966), Serbian politician
 Sava Vuković (1912-1961), Serbian chess master
 Sava Vuković (1930-2001), Serbian orthodox bishop
 Sebő Vukovics (1811-1872), Hungarian Minister of Justice 1849, of Serbian descent
 Slobodan Vuković (1986), Serbian footballer
 Stefan Vukovic (born 1993), Canadian footballer and coach
 Stjepan Vuković (born 1997), Croatian footballer
 Vanja Vukovic (born 1971), German fine-art photographer and photo-designer of Montenegrin descent
 Veselin Vuković (born 1958), Yugoslav handball player
 Vićenco Vuković (fl. 1560–71), printer and editor of books in Serbian in the Republic of Venice
 Violeta Vuković (born 1972), Serbian basketball player
 Vlatko Vuković (died 1392), Grand Duke of Hum (modern Herzegovina)
 Vladimir Vuković (1898-1975), Croatian chess player, writer, theoretician
 Vladimir Vuković (born 1989), Canadian footballer
 Želimir Vuković (born 1983), Serbian alpine skier
 Željko Vuković (footballer, born 1962), Croatian-born Austrian footballer
 Željko Vuković (footballer, born 1963), Montenegrin footballer
 Zoran Vuković (born 1955), Bosnian Serb soldier charged with crimes in the Bosnian War

See also
Vukovich, a transliteration

References

Bosnian surnames
Croatian surnames
Montenegrin surnames
Serbian surnames
Patronymic surnames
Surnames from given names